Melmoth is a small town situated in KwaZulu-Natal, South Africa. The town was established in the Mthonjaneni district after the annexation of Zululand by the British Empire in 1887 and was named after Sir Melmoth Osborn, the resident commissioner of Zululand's "Reserve Territory". Large wattle plantations were set up and a wattle bark factory was established in 1926. The district is also planted with sugar cane from the outskirts of the town and into the surrounding villages. The government-funded hospital in Melmoth is St Marys kwaMagwaza Hospital that caters for the people of Melmoth and surrounding villages.

The main road to Piet Retief is extremely busy during holiday periods.

Vehicle registrations in Melmoth start with NO - N for Natal, O for Osborn.

References

Populated places in the Mthonjaneni Local Municipality
Populated places established in 1887